The canton of Bourg-de-Visa is a French former administrative division in the department of Tarn-et-Garonne and region Midi-Pyrénées. It had 2,126 inhabitants (2012). It was disbanded following the French canton reorganisation which came into effect in March 2015.

The canton comprised the following communes:
 Bourg-de-Visa
 Brassac
 Fauroux
 Lacour
 Miramont-de-Quercy
 Saint-Nazaire-de-Valentane
 Touffailles

References

Bourg-de-Visa
2015 disestablishments in France
States and territories disestablished in 2015